Roxanne Franck (born 14 January 1998)  is a French handball player who plays for Paris 92 and the France national team.

Achievements 
Junior European Championship:
Gold Medalist: 2017

References

1998 births
Living people
Sportspeople from Mulhouse
French female handball players